is a railway station in the city of  Kamagaya, Chiba, Japan, operated by the private railway operator Tōbu Railway. The station is numbered "TD-31".

Lines

Station layout
The station consists of two opposed elevated side platforms, with the station building located underneath.

Platforms

Adjacent stations

History
Kamagaya Station opened on 27 December 1923.

From 17 March 2012, station numbering was introduced on all Tōbu lines, with Kamagaya Station becoming "TD-31".

Passenger statistics
In fiscal 2017, the station was used by an average of 22,828 passengers daily.

Surrounding area
Kamagaya Post Office
Michinobe Hachiman-gu Shrine
Kamagaya High School

See also
 List of railway stations in Japan

References

External links

 Tobu station information 

Railway stations in Japan opened in 1923
Railway stations in Chiba Prefecture
Tobu Noda Line
Stations of Tobu Railway
Kamagaya